Baberton is a suburb of Edinburgh, the capital of Scotland. It is south-west of the Edinburgh City Bypass and Wester Hailes and south of the Shotts Line railway line. The village of Juniper Green is situated to the south of Baberton and Baberton Golf Course is to the west.

Most of Baberton comprises a housing estate built in the early 1970s by George Wimpey. All streets take the "Baberton" name but some streets in Juniper Green also take the name.

Baberton House was designed and built in 1623 for his own occupation by the architect Sir James Murray of Kilbaberton (d.1634), King's Master of Works. Bradshaw's Guide says it was the hunting lodge of King James VI and that King Charles X of France lived here after the July Revolution of 1830. 

Baberton House was the home of the Edinburgh physician Byrom Bramwell, and his friend and colleague Charles Edward Underhill died here in 1908.

References

Areas of Edinburgh